John Henry Nelson (15 March 1906 – 1986) was an English footballer who played in the Football League for Luton Town, Preston North End and Wolverhampton Wanderers.

References

1906 births
1986 deaths
English footballers
Association football forwards
English Football League players
Chorley F.C. players
Preston North End F.C. players
Wolverhampton Wanderers F.C. players
Luton Town F.C. players